Lac La Belle is a  lake in Grant Township, Keweenaw County, Michigan. The lake is surrounded by dense forest cover of the Keweenaw Peninsula. The Little Gratiot River flows into the lake on the west shore and the lake empties through the Mendota Canal into Lake Superior. There is a state owned boat launch on the north side of the lake near the community of Lac La Belle.

Haven Falls is a waterfall that is part of the Haven Creek.

See also 
 List of lakes in Michigan

References

Lakes of Michigan
Geography of Keweenaw County, Michigan